Season 2019–20 was Dumbarton's second in the third tier of Scottish football having finished sixth in the division in 2018–19. Dumbarton also competed in the Challenge Cup, Scottish League Cup and the Scottish Cup.

Story of the season

May 
Dumbarton's first transfer business of the 2019–20 season saw defender Cammy Ballantyne leave the club for Montrose. Ballantyne was followed by Craig Barr and Brian McLean who turned down new deals, along with Grant Adam, Willie Dyer, Ross Perry, Michael Paton and Ryan Thomson who were released at the end of their contracts. After lengthy negotiations it was eventually revealed on 29 May that Jim Duffy would remain as the club's manager - having guided the club from a relegation battle to sixth place in Scottish League One the previous season. The same day the club were drawn against Motherwell. Greenock Morton, Queen of the South and Annan Athletic in the group stages of the 2019–20 Scottish League Cup. The following day club captain Ross Forbes departed for Forfar Athletic. On 31 May the club announced their first two signings of the summer - with Stefan McCluskey and Morgyn Neill signing from Pollok and Stenhousemuir respectively.

June 
June opened with Bobby Barr leaving the club to join Lowland League outfit East Stirlingshire. Shortly after Kyle Hutton became the first member of the previous season's squad to sign-up for the new campaign, inking a new one-year deal. Meanwhile, friendlies were arranged for July with Dunfermline Athletic, Dundee United and Hamilton Academical. Jordan Pettigrew became the club's third signing of the summer, joining from Livingston and he was followed by midfielder Conor Scullion from Cumbernauld United and forward Ryan Tierney from Edusport Academy. Top scorer from the previous two season Calum Gallagher departed the club for Airdrieonians however. The following day Isaac Layne became the club's sixth new signing of the window whilst goalkeeper Conor Brennan also agreed a new deal. Player of the Year Stuart Carswell was next to renew his contract, penning a new one-year deal.

July 
Defender Jordan McMillan was the club's next addition, signing on the same day as the club's first pre-season match with Dunfermline Athletic was cancelled. Defender Lewis Crawford was next to sign up, joining from junior side Petershill. He made his debut the following day, in a 3–2 victory against Dundee United with all three goals coming from trialists - Muhammadu Faal, Joe McKee and Mati Zata. The Sons final pre-season game ended in defeat, 2–0 to a young Hamilton Academical side. On 11 July, just two days before the start of the Scottish League Cup, Duffy added four players: Mati Zata, Ruaridh Langan, PJ Crossan and Rico Quitongo to his squad. The club's new kit was revealed the following day, with a return to a yellow and black home kit after seven seasons in white and gold. Ryan McGeever then became the Sons 13th signing of the summer. The competitive season started with a 1–0 victory against Annan Athletic with Ryan Tierney scoring the only goal of the game. On Monday 15 July Matthew Shiels became the club's first loan signing of the summer, joining on a deal until January 2020. After a heavy defeat to Greenock Morton in the Scottish League Cup Duffy moved into the transfer market again - signing Joe McKee on a one-year deal. The League Cup campaign ended with defeats to Queen of the South and Motherwell.

August 
Before the start of the new season Rory Loy left the club having not made an appearance for 11 months following a serious back injury. The Sons league season opened with a 1–0 defeat to Raith Rovers. A heavy defeat to Falkirk followed, before a humiliating defeat to St Mirren under-21s in the Scottish Challenge Cup. The Sons recorded their first victory of the new season on 17 August, coming from 2-0 down to defeat Peterhead 3–2 at Balmoor Stadium thanks to goals from Ruaridh Langan, PJ Crossan and Isaac Layne. Prior to the next game against Stranraer Reghan Tumilty became the club's 16th signing of the summer, joining on loan until January from Greenock Morton.  Tumility scored his first goal for the club in the afternoon, with Layne continuing his good from with a brace as Sons recorded a first home win of the campaign. The game also marked Stuart Carswell's 100th Dumbarton appearance. The month ended with a 2–1 victory against Montrose, where Layne again scored a double.

September 
September opened with defeat to Airdrieonians. That was followed by a 2–2 draw with East Fife where Ryan McGeever scored his first goal for the club, with Isaac Layne taking his total to six for the season from the penalty spot. A defeat to Clyde followed, before Adam Frizzell became the club's 17th signing of the summer - joining on loan from Kilmarnock.

October 
Frizzell made his debut in a 3–1 victory against Forfar Athletic where he scored twice, meaning that the Sons ended the first quarter of the season in fifth place with 13 points from their first nine games. Two more positive results followed to ensure that the Sons ended the month undefeated, a 0–0 draw with Stranraer and a 1–0 victory against Peterhead with Ryan McGeever scoring his second goal of the campaign.

November 
November began with a 3–1 defeat to Airdrieonians, with Calum Gallagher giving the hosts the lead after just 27 seconds. Another defeat followed, this time by four goals to two at home to East Fife. A 1–1 draw with Falkirk saw Isaac Layne score for the first time since September - with his 30th-minute strike being cancelled out by Declan McManus's injury time penalty. Before the next game Lewis Crawford and Mati Zata left the club on loan, joining Junior side Rossvale until January.

December 
A 2–0 home defeat to Montrose opened December, before a 4-3 comeback victory against Forfar Athletic where Sons had been 1–0, 2-1 and 3-2 down but came back to win with strikes from Joe McKee, Reghan Tumilty and a PJ Crossan brace. Defender Jordan McMillan was next leave, joining Pollok on a short-term loan, before the Sons defeated table-topping Raith Rovers at Stark's Park with goals from Crossan and Ryan McGeever. The year ended with a 1–1 draw against Stranraer where the Sons were able to name just one outfield sub. Ryan Tierney, on his first start since August, got the goal.

January 
January began with Mati Zata and Lewis Crawford being recalled from their loan spell with Rossvale after an injury crisis left the duo as the only outfield substitutes for the 3–0 defeat to Falkirk. Dumbarton's squad then took another hit when defender Reghan Tumilty returned to Greenock Morton at the end of his loan spell. The following week a waterlogged pitch caused the postponement of a home tie with Clyde. Callum Wilson became the first signing of the winter window, joining from Partick Thistle. A controversial late penalty then saw the Sons exit the Scottish Cup at the hands of Aberdeen. Sam Wardrop became the club's second signing of the window, joining for a second loan spell on 23 January - this time on a temporary deal from Dundee United until the end of the season. Wardrop debuted two days later in a 1–0 defeat to Peterhead that left the Sons without a win, or a goal, in the month of January. After the match Jim Duffy confirmed that winger Conor Scullion was to leave the club. Two days later assistant manager Craig McPherson left the club and was replaced by former Dundee manager Barry Smith. Jai Quitongo became the club's second signing of the winter, joining after leaving Persian Gulf Pro League side Machine Sazi. The month ended with defender Jordan McMillan leaving the club and striker Robert Jones joining from Stranraer. On deadline day Ross Forbes returned to the club from Forfar Athletic.

February 
Jones opened his account for the Sons on his debut in a 4–2 defeat to East Fife. That was followed by a 0–0 home draw against Airdrieonians in the club's first home game of 2020. The winless run continued into mid-February after a 2–1 defeat to Montrose but was finally ended on 25 February with a 1–0 victory against Clyde where Morgyn Neill got the only goal. That was followed up by another victory, with Stuart Carswell scoring an injury time winner at home to Raith Rovers.

March 
March opened with a 2–0 victory against Forfar Athletic where Ross Forbes scored his first goal since returning to the club, and Jai Quitongo also scored his first for the Sons. A 2–0 defeat to Clyde ended the unbeaten run four days later. On Friday 13 March all Scottish football was suspended indefinitely due to the coronavirus pandemic. A week later midfielder Mati Zata left the club whilst chairman John Steele admitted the pandemic presented a risk to the club's future.

April 
Having not played since early March, and with football suspended until at least June, the decision was taken to end the 2019–20 season on 15 April, with the Sons sitting sixth in Scottish League One.

May 
At a virtual player of the year awards ceremony held on 2 May, Kyle Hutton was named as the club's Player of the Season and Players' Player of the Season, whilst Rico Quitongo was named Young Player of the Season.

First team transfers 
From end of 2018–19 season, to last match of season 2019–20

In

Out

Fixtures and results

Friendlies

Scottish League One

Scottish Cup

Scottish League Cup

Table

Matches

Scottish Challenge Cup

Player statistics

All competitions

Captains

League table

References 

Dumbarton
Dumbarton